Ube cake is a traditional Filipino chiffon cake or sponge cake made with ube halaya (mashed purple yam). It is distinctively vividly purple in color, like most dishes made with ube in the Philippines.

Preparation
Ube cake is generally prepared identically to mamón (chiffon cakes and sponge cakes in Filipino cuisine), but with the addition of mashed purple yam to the ingredients. It is typically made with flour, eggs, sugar, a dash of salt, baking powder, vanilla, oil, milk, and cream of tartar. The resulting cake is pink to purple in color (depending on the amount of ube used) and slightly denser and moister than regular chiffon cakes.

Ube cake typically has a whipped cream, cream cheese, or buttercream frosting, which may also be flavored with ube or coconut.

Variations

Like mamón, ube cake can be modified readily into other recipes.

Ube macapuno cake
The combination of ube and macapuno (coconut sport) is a traditional one for ube halaya in Filipino cuisine, and it also applies to ube cakes. Ube macapuno cake is basically just ube cake with strips of gelatinous macapuno strips layered on top.

Other combinations of ube cake include ube pandan cake and ube leche flan cake, among others.

Ube mamón
Ube mamón or ube cupcakes are ube cakes baked into the shape of large cupcakes, which is the traditional shape of Filipino chiffon cakes.

Ube roll
Ube roll or ube pianono is a variant of ube cake made into a Swiss roll (known as pianono in the Philippines). It typically has an ube filling made with butter, sugar, milk, and mashed ube. A very similar dessert made from meringue instead of chiffon or sponge cake is brazo de ube, which is more accurately a variant of brazo de Mercedes.

Ube taisan
Ube taisan is a version of ube cake cooked as a traditional Filipino taisan cake. Like the taisan, it is rectangular in shape and is not frosted, but is covered with butter (or margarine), cheese, and white sugar.

See also
Ube cheesecake
Mango cake
 Flan cake
Brazo de Mercedes
Crema de fruta
Mango float
Buko pandan cake
Ube crinkles
Ube ice cream

References

Philippine desserts
Christmas cakes
Cakes
Ube dishes